Lupa Island is an island on the Danube in Hungary. It forms part of the town of Budakalász, in Szentendre District of Pest County.

The island is inhabited, and there a number of houses on it. It is only accessible by boat.

References

River islands of Hungary
Islands of the Danube